John Fisher (10 October 1937 – 24 January 1998) was an Australian rules footballer who played for Hawthorn in the VFL.

A wingman, Fisher debuted for Hawthorn in 1957 but it took a couple of seasons before he became a regular in the side. He won the Gardiner Medal in 1958 for the best player in the VFL reserves competition.

References

External links

1937 births
Australian rules footballers from Victoria (Australia)
Hawthorn Football Club players
Hawthorn Football Club Premiership players
1998 deaths
One-time VFL/AFL Premiership players